Mahdi Faisal Ebrahim Al-Humaidan (born 19 May 1993) is a Bahraini footballer who plays as a forward for Al Khaldiya and the Bahrain national team.

International career
Al-Humaidan was included in Bahrain's squad for the 2019 AFC Asian Cup in the United Arab Emirates. Humaidan played twice for Bahrain during the Asian Cup which ended in an eventual Round of 16 elimination to South Korea after Extra Time. During the 24th Arabian Gulf Cup, Humaidan played in three matches - against Oman, Kuwait and Saudi Arabia in the Final. In total he provided 3 assists, including the winning assist in the Final to Mohamed Al Romaihi which won Bahrain their first ever Gulf Cup.

Career statistics

International

International goals

Honours
International

Bahrain

• Gulf Cup 2019

References

External links
 
 
 
 
 Mahdi Al-Humaidan at WorldFootball.com

1993 births
Living people
Sportspeople from Manama
Bahraini footballers
Bahraini expatriate footballers
Bahrain international footballers
Association football forwards
Al-Ahli Club (Manama) players
Al-Qadsiah FC players
Bahraini Premier League players
Saudi First Division League players
2019 AFC Asian Cup players
Bahraini expatriate sportspeople in Saudi Arabia
Expatriate footballers in Saudi Arabia